Song in the Air is an album by American emo band Elliott, released in 2003.

Critical reception
Drowned in Sound wrote that "this is Elliott finally realising the ideas exposed on previous recordings, taking the time to focus and fully indulge in glorious sound-scapes and soothing arrangements, and resulting in an album that is pure golden beauty throughout." CMJ New Music Report called the album a "collection of unshakably gratifying songs."

Track listing

References

2003 albums
Elliott (band) albums
Revelation Records albums